Pantelodes is a genus of moths of the family Apatelodidae. It was first described by Daniel Herbin in 2017, containing at the time nine species: Pantelodes satellitia (transferred from Apatelodes) and eight newly described species previously identified as the former. In 2021, an additional species, Pantelodes camacana, was described. The distribution of the genus is Neotropical.

Species

Pantelodes amazonica Herbin, 2017
Pantelodes boliviana Herbin, 2017
Pantelodes camacana Orlandin & Carneiro, 2021
Pantelodes centralamericana Herbin, 2017
Pantelodes drechseli Herbin, 2017
Pantelodes iracoubo Herbin, 2017
Pantelodes maranhensis Herbin, 2017
Pantelodes organabo Herbin, 2017
Pantelodes ruschii Herbin, 2017
Pantelodes satellitia (Walker, 1855)

References

Apatelodidae
Moth genera